Zaire Franklin (born July 2, 1996) is an American football linebacker for the Indianapolis Colts of the National Football League (NFL). He played college football at Syracuse.

College career
While at Syracause, Franklin recorded 311 career tackles over the course of 48 total games, starting the final 39 of his career. Franklin was a two-time All-Atlantic Coast Conference selection. Additionally, he was only the second three-time captain in Orange football history and the first since 1896.

Professional career

Franklin was drafted by the Indianapolis Colts in the seventh round, 235th overall, of the 2018 NFL Draft. The Colts previously obtained the pick used to select Franklin by trading Henry Anderson to the New York Jets. Franklin made his NFL debut on September 9, 2018 against the Cincinnati Bengals, recording one tackle on special teams. He made his first career start at linebacker on September 23 against the Philadelphia Eagles, notching one tackle on defense and another on special teams. In his rookie season, Franklin appeared in all 16 regular season games, starting two, and recorded 29 tackles and one pass defended.

On September 8, 2020 Franklin was named one of the five team captains heading into the 2020 season.

On March 16, 2022, Franklin signed a three-year, $12 million contract extension with the Colts.

References

External links
Indianapolis Colts bio
Syracuse bio

1996 births
Living people
Players of American football from Philadelphia
American football linebackers
Syracuse Orange football players
Indianapolis Colts players